Russ Peterson or Russell Peterson may refer to:
 Russ Peterson (gridiron football) (1905–1971), American football offensive lineman
 Russ Peterson (coach), American college basketball, football, and baseball coach in the 1930s to 1950s
 Russell W. Peterson (1916–2011), American politician

See also
 Peter Russell (disambiguation)